Kenya national field hockey team may refer to:
 Kenya men's national field hockey team
 Kenya women's national field hockey team